Philometra lagocephali is a species of parasitic nematode of fishes, first found off New Caledonia in the South Pacific Ocean in the abdominal cavity of Lagocephalus sceleratus. This species is characterized mainly by the length of its spicules, length and structure of its gubernaculum, body size, location in host and types of hosts.

References

Further reading

Moravec, F., et al. "Two species of Philometra (Nematoda: Philometridae) from sparid fishes (porgies) off Sicily, Italy, including Philometra obladae sp. n. from the body cavity of Oblada melanura (Sparidae)." Parasitology research 104.1 (2008): 55-61.
Wang, Shu-Xia, Liang Li, and Lu-Ping Zhang. "Redescription and genetic characterization of Philometra lagocephali Moravec et Justine 2008 (Nematoda: Philometridae) from Lagocephalus lunaris (Bloch and Schneider)(Tetraodontiformes: Tetradontidae) in the South China Sea." Acta Parasitologica 60.3 (2015): 395-406.

Camallanida
Parasitic nematodes of fish
Nematodes described in 2008